Dāryān or Dārīān or Dāreyān may refer to:
Daryan, East Azerbaijan, Iran
Daryan, Kurdistan, Iran